Richard Haensch (active from 1890) was a German entomologist and insect dealer in Berlin.

Haensch collected in Bahia (1893–1894), Minas Gerais (1896–1897) and Ecuador (1899–1900).

He wrote the section "Familie Danaidae" in Die Gross-Schmetterlinge der Erde [The Large Butterflies of the World] (1909–1910)  edited by Adalbert Seitz and published by Alfred Kernen, Stuttgart, Germany. His revision of the subfamily Ithomiinae is still the standard work. The types of the new taxa he described are in Museum für Naturkunde Berlin. Coleoptera and Arachnida supplied by his dealership are in the same museum. Hemiptera (rarely available from dealerships) are in Staatliches Museum für Tierkunde Dresden and Institute of Zoology, Polish Academy of Sciences, Warsaw (originally supplied to Natural History Museum, Stettin) and in the German Entomological Institute collection.

Haensch is commemorated in the scientific name of a species of South American lizard, Stenocercus haenschi.

Sources
Gaedeck R, Groll EK (editors) (2010). Biografien der Entomologen der Welt: Datenbank. Version 4.15. Senckenberg Deutsches Entomologisches Institut.  (in German).

References

German lepidopterists
Year of death missing
19th-century German zoologists